Dustin Tebbutt is an Australian musician from Armidale, New South Wales. He began recording music in 2013 and released his debut EP, titled The Breach, the same year. He has since released four additional EPs and one full-length album, First Light, in 2016.

Biography
Tebbutt released his first single, "The Breach", in 2013, and it reached #76 on the ARIA singles chart and was #44 in the 2013 Triple J Hottest 100. His EP Home and debut album First Light reached #34 and #13 respectively on the ARIA albums chart. He was nominated for the 2014 ARIA Music Award for Engineer of the Year for his EP Bones.
In 2018, Tebbutt collaborated with Australian electronic duo Flight Facilities on the song "All Your Love", which later appeared on his EP Chasing Gold.

In 2019, Tebbutt launched a new collaborative project called OK Moon, which he said he had been working on for a couple of years. Other members of the "supergroup" include LANKS, Xavier Dunn, and Hayden Calnin. They released their first single, "Loved You Right", in March 2019, and their debut self-titled album came out in August of the same year.

Discography

Solo

Albums

EPs

Singles

As lead artist

As featured artist

With OK Moon

Albums

Singles

References

External links
 Official website

Living people
People from Armidale
Australian musicians
Australian indie pop musicians
Australian folk musicians
Year of birth missing (living people)